The Enlisted Person of the Year Ribbon is a decoration of the United States Coast Guard which was established in 1999, though retroactive to 1994, by order of the Commandant of the Coast Guard.

The Enlisted Person of the Year Ribbon is annually awarded to two members of the Coast Guard, paygrade E-2 through E-6; the Coast Guard Enlisted Person of the Year (EPOY) and the Coast Guard Reserve Enlisted Person of the Year (REPOY).

The selection based on a display of pride, professionalism, and dedication to Coast Guard core values, and is made by a panel of Master Chief Petty Officers, led by the Master Chief Petty Officer of the Coast Guard (MCPOCG). The decoration is a one time only award and there are no devices authorized for multiple presentations.

The Coast Guard Reserve Enlisted Person of the Year was previously called the "NERA Outstanding Enlisted CG Reservist Award".

This award was based on the Outstanding Airman of the Year Ribbon, which is awarded by the United States Air Force.  The United States Army, United States Navy, and United States Marine Corps have no award equivalent to the Enlisted Person of the Year Ribbon, although do maintain similar programs for yearly recognition of outstanding enlisted personnel.

References

Awards and decorations of the United States Coast Guard
Awards established in 1999
US Coast Guard ribbon symbolism
1999 establishments in the United States